Caniapiscau is a Regional County Municipality of Côte-Nord, Québec, Canada.

Caniapiscau may also refer to:

Toponyms
 Caniapiscau, Quebec, an unorganized territory
 Caniapiscau River, a river of Ungava Bay watershed
 Caniapiscau Reservoir, a reservoir on the upper Caniapiscau River in the Côte-Nord administrative region of Quebec
 Caniapiscau Aerodrome, located near Caniapiscau, Quebec, Canada